Taylors Lake is a reservoir in Bartow County, in the U.S. state of Georgia.

Taylors Lake was named in honor of Glen Taylor.

References

Reservoirs in Georgia (U.S. state)
Bodies of water of Bartow County, Georgia